Donald Goldstein (1937 – May 27, 2022), known as "Red", was an American college All-American and Pan American Games champion basketball player.

Early life
Goldstein was Jewish.  His mother died when he was four. He grew up poor, in the Brooklyn ghetto of Brownsville, and attended Flatbush's Samuel J. Tilden High School, where he was an all-city basketball player and graduated in 1955.

College and Pan American Games
He attended the University of Louisville on a scholarship that paid for room, board, and books, and played forward for the school from 1956 to 1959. He said: "these guys never saw a Jew. They once asked me once with no malice how old I was when they cut off my horns. I never had a bad day [with my teammates]. I never heard one anti-Semitic remark in Louisville. If you could play, that was it."

In 1959, Goldstein was named All-American and led Louisville to its first-ever appearance in the NCAA Final Four. Goldstein averaged 21.4 points and 10.0 rebounds in the NCAA tournament, and was named to the All-Mideast Regional Team and the All-Tournament Team.

That same year, he won a gold medal in basketball at the 1959 Pan American Games.

In his three years at Louisville, Goldstein scored 1,019 points (the 10th Cardinal to score over 1,000 points) and had 838 rebounds (still 10th all-time in school history).

Draft and later life
Goldstein was the first pick in the second round (8th overall) of the Detroit Pistons in 1959, offered a $7,500 ($ in current dollar terms) salary and a $500 ($ in current dollar terms) signing bonus to buy a car, but he did not play in the NBA. Instead, he went to dental school, and was a dentist on Long Island.  He lived in Boca Raton, Florida.

Honors
In 1980, he was inducted into the Louisville Hall of Fame. The Basketball Old-Timers of America inducted him into its hall of fame. His jersey was retired in January 2000.  In 2012, he was inducted into the New York City Basketball Hall of Fame.  He is also a member of the New York State Basketball Hall of Fame.    In 2014, he was inducted into the National Jewish Sports Hall of Fame.

References

1937 births
2022 deaths
American dentists
American men's basketball players
Basketball players at the 1959 Pan American Games
Basketball players from New York City
Detroit Pistons draft picks
Forwards (basketball)
20th-century American Jews
Jewish men's basketball players
Louisville Cardinals men's basketball players
Medalists at the 1959 Pan American Games
Pan American Games gold medalists for the United States
Pan American Games medalists in basketball
People from Huntington, New York
Samuel J. Tilden High School alumni
Sportspeople from Brooklyn
Sportspeople from Suffolk County, New York
United States men's national basketball team players